Thomas C. Miller Public School is a historic school building located in Fairmont, Marion County, West Virginia.
It was built in 1914 with an annex added in 1928. The original building is Colonial Revival in style with Jacobethan style detailing in the
entrance surrounds. The architect was Frank L. Packard.

The 1928 annex is a three-story brick building with concrete foundation, laid in the Flemish garden wall (Sussex) bond.  William B. Ittner was the architect.

The school was named for Thomas Condit Miller, an educator in Fairmont, professor of education at West Virginia University,  State Superintendent of Schools for West Virginia, and ninth principal of Shepherd College.

It was listed on the National Register of Historic Places in 2013.

References

Colonial Revival architecture in West Virginia
Defunct schools in West Virginia
Former school buildings in the United States
Frank Packard buildings
Jacobean architecture in West Virginia
National Register of Historic Places in Marion County, West Virginia
School buildings completed in 1914
1914 establishments in West Virginia
School buildings on the National Register of Historic Places in West Virginia
Schools in Marion County, West Virginia
William B. Ittner buildings